The 2022 24H GT Series powered by Hankook was the eighth season of the 24H Series with drivers battling for championship points and titles and the thirteenth season since Creventic, the organiser and promoter of the series, organised multiple races a year. The races were contested with GT3-spec cars, GT4-spec cars, sports cars and 24H-Specials, like silhouette cars.

Calendar 

† - Non-championship round.

The following events were scheduled to take place but were cancelled.

Teams and drivers

Race Results
Bold indicates overall winner.

Championship standings

Continents GT3 Drivers'

† – Drivers did not finish the race, but were classified as they completed over 50% of the class winner's race distance.

Continents GT3 Teams'

† – Drivers did not finish the race, but were classified as they completed over 50% of the class winner's race distance.

Continents GT3 Pro-Am Drivers'

† – Drivers did not finish the race, but were classified as they completed over 50% of the class winner's race distance.

Continents GT3 Pro-Am Drivers'

† – Drivers did not finish the race, but were classified as they completed over 50% of the class winner's race distance.

Continents GT3 Am Drivers'

† – Drivers did not finish the race, but were classified as they completed over 50% of the class winner's race distance.

Continents GT3 Am Teams'

† – Drivers did not finish the race, but were classified as they completed over 50% of the class winner's race distance.

Continents GTX Drivers'

† – Drivers did not finish the race, but were classified as they completed over 50% of the class winner's race distance.

Continents GTX Teams'

† – Drivers did not finish the race, but were classified as they completed over 50% of the class winner's race distance.

Continents 992 Drivers'

† – Drivers did not finish the race, but were classified as they completed over 50% of the class winner's race distance.

See also
24H Series

Notes

References

External links

24H GT Series
2022 in 24H Series